Claude Duflos (1665–1727) was a French engraver.

Duflos was born and died in Paris. It is not known by whom he was instructed, but his style resembles that of François de Poilly.  He left a great number of plates, executed principally with the burin, and very neatly finished. The following are the most notable:

Portraits

Philip, Duke of Orleans; after R. Tournières.
Jean-François-Paul de Gondy, Cardinal de Retz.
Denis-François de Chavigny, Bishop of Troyes.
Nicolas Lyon, Procureur du Roi; after Herluyson.
Jean Jacques Gaudart, Conseiller du Roi; after Largillière.
Marc René de Voyer; after Hyacinthe Rigaud.

Subjects after various masters
The Entombment of Christ; after P. Perugino; for the Crozat Collection.
The same subject; after Raphael.
St. Michael discomfiting the Evil Spirit; after the same; for the Crozat Collection.
Christ with the Disciples at Emmaus; after Paolo Veronese; for the Crozat Collection.
'The Adulteress before Christ; after N. Colombel.Christ at table with the Disciples; after Titian.Bust of the Virgin; after Guido.The Annunciation; after Albani.Christ appearing to Mary Magdalen; after the same.St. Cecilia; after P. Mignard.The Presentation in the Temple; after Le Sueur.The Descent from the Cross; after the same.The Murder of the Innocents; after Le Brun.Christ on the Mount of Olives; after the same.The Crucifixion; after the same.
The same subject; after the same; from the print by Edelinck.The Dead Christ, with the Virgin and St. John; after the same.The Descent of the Holy Ghost; after the same.The Assumption of the Virgin; after the same.The Penitent Magdalen; after the same.The Annunciation; after A. Coypel.The Crucifixion; after the same.The Magdalen at the foot of the Cross; after the same.A Concert; after Domenichino.The Triumph of Galatea; after the same.Cupid stung by a Bee; after the same.
The same subject; smaller and circular.Bacchus and Ariadne; after the same.The Triumph of Bacchus; after C. Natoire.The Triumph of Amphitrite''; after the same.

References

 

1665 births
1727 deaths
17th-century French engravers
18th-century French engravers
Engravers from Paris